The following is the list of squads for each of the 16 teams competing in the EuroBasket 1997, held in Spain between 24 June and 6 July 1997. Each team selected a squad of 12 players for the tournament.

Group A

Bosnia and Herzegovina

Greece

Russia

Turkey

Group B

France

Israel

Lithuania

Slovenia

Group C

Italy

Latvia

Poland

FR Yugoslavia

Group D

Croatia

Germany

Spain

Ukraine

References
 1997 European Championship for Men, FIBA.com.
 European Championship 1997 - National Squads, LinguaSport.com.

1997